Cora minutula is a species of basidiolichen in the family Hygrophoraceae. Found in Ecuador, it was formally described as a new species in 2016 by Robert Lücking, Bibiana Moncada, and Alba Yánez-Ayabaca. The lichen is known only from the type locality, in the páramo of La Virgen (Papallacta, Napo. Here, in the northern Andes at elevations above , it grows as an epiphyte on páramo shrubs.

References

minutula
Lichen species
Lichens described in 2016
Lichens of Ecuador
Taxa named by Robert Lücking
Basidiolichens